Mehdi Tarfi (born 5 July 1993) is a Belgian footballer of Moroccan descent who currently plays for Lierse Kempenzonen.

External links

1994 births
Living people
Belgian footballers
Belgian sportspeople of Moroccan descent
R.S.C. Anderlecht players
S.V. Zulte Waregem players
Royal Antwerp F.C. players
K.M.S.K. Deinze players
Belgian Pro League players
Challenger Pro League players
Footballers from Brussels
Association football midfielders